S39 may refer to:

Aviation 
 Blériot-SPAD S.39, a French reconnaissance aircraft
 Letov Š-39, a Czechoslovakian sport aircraft
 Prineville Airport, in Crook County, Oregon, United States
 Sikorsky S-39, an American flying boat

Other uses 
 S39: Wear eye/face protection, a safety phrase
 New Jersey Route 68, designated Route S39 until 1953
 Sulfur-39, an isotope of sulfur
 , a submarine in the United States Navy